Point Bridge Capital is an investment company founded by Hal Lambert in 2013.

Point Bridge is known for "MAGA ETF", an exchange-traded fund on the BATS Global Markets exchange that invests in companies that are especially active in Republican circles. The fund's selection criteris uses Federal Election Commission data to select the top 150 companies. The name is a nod to Make America Great Again, the 2016 presidential campaign slogan of Donald Trump. The fund is administered by Point Bridge and distributed by Foreside Fund Services. The fund launched on September 6, 2017 in reaction to Target Corp's inclusive bathroom policy in 2016 and Donald Trump's nomination. It has a higher expense ratio of 0.72% than simple trackers and funds, which run from 0.04% to 0.08%.

In 2018 the holdings ($39 million) were about 21% industrials, 20% finance, 17% oil and gas, and only 0.6% in tech, with top holdings in Freeport-McMoRan, Apache Corporation, Marathon Oil, TechnipFMC, and Williams Companies.

By February 29, 2020, the top holdings were L Brands, Apache Corp, Rollins, Inc., NextEra Energy, and Old Dominion Freight Line.

Hal Lambert was previously a director at Credit Suisse and manager at JP Morgan. Politically, Lambert is a Republican donor and finance chair, and was on the Trump inaugural committee. Lambert is a frequent guest on Fox Business and has promoted the MAGA ETF at FreedomFest 2018, and on CNBC, Hugh Hewitt, Mike Gallagher, Fox News, Fox Business, One America News Network, i24 News, and Yahoo! Finance.

References

External links
 
 

Exchange-traded funds
Financial services companies established in 2013
Donald Trump 2016 presidential campaign